Allium caspium is a species of onions named for the Caspian Sea. It is native to the southern parts of European Russia, as well as central and southwestern Asia

Varieties
Two formal botanical varieties are recognized:
Allium caspium subsp. baissunense (Lipsky) F.O.Khass. & R.M.Fritsch - Tajikistan, Uzbekistan
Allium caspium  subsp. caspium - European Russia, Kazakhstan, Turkmenistan, Uzbekistan, northern Caucasus, Afghanistan, Iran, Pakistan

References

caspium
Onions
Flora of Russia
Flora of temperate Asia
Plants described in 1773